The 2015 Princeton Tigers football team represented Princeton University in the 2015 NCAA Division I FCS football season. They were led by sixth-year head coach Bob Surace and played their home games at Powers Field at Princeton Stadium. Princeton was member of the Ivy League. They finished the season 5–5 overall and 2–5 in Ivy League play to place sixth. Princeton averaged 8,265 fans per gam.

Legacy Bowl
During the off season, Princeton participated in the 2015 Legacy Bowl. The team traveled to the Kincho Stadium in Nishinomiya, Hyōgo, Japan to play Kwansei Gakuin University of the Kansai Collegiate American Football League. Princeton won 36–7.

Schedule

References

Princeton
Princeton Tigers football seasons
Princeton Tigers football